The H. Orton Wiley House, located at 524 E. Dewey in Nampa, Idaho, was built in 1922.  It was listed on the National Register of Historic Places in 1986.  It has also been known as Wiley Alumni House.

It is a two-story brick house on the edge of the campus of the Northwest Nazarene College.

It is significant for its "association with the organization and early development of Northwest Nazarene College and with the college's first president, H. Orton Wiley. Built in 1922-23, the house is the only building that survives to represent the early era in Northwest Nazarene College history."

References

Houses on the National Register of Historic Places in Idaho
Houses completed in 1922
Canyon County, Idaho